Fréthun is a commune in the Pas-de-Calais department in the Hauts-de-France region of France.

Geography
A village located 3 miles (5 km) southwest of Calais, at the junction of the D215 and D246 roads. It is home to the Calais-Fréthun railway station and the Eurotunnel terminal, linking France with England.

Population
The inhabitants are called Fréthunois.

Places of interest
 The church of St. Michel, dating from the nineteenth century.

See also
 Communes of the Pas-de-Calais department

References

Communes of Pas-de-Calais
Pale of Calais